Cameroon competed at the 2020 Summer Olympics in Tokyo. Originally scheduled to take place from 24 July to 9 August 2020, the Games were postponed to 23 July to 8 August 2021, because of the COVID-19 pandemic. It was the nation's fifteenth consecutive appearance at the Summer Olympics.

Competitors
The following is the list of number of competitors in the Games.

Athletics

Cameroon received a universality slot from the World Athletics to send a male athlete to the Olympics.

Track & road events

Boxing

Cameroon entered three male boxers into the Olympic tournament. Rio 2016 Olympian Wilfried Ntsengue (men's middleweight), along with rookies Albert Mengue (men's welterweight) and Maxime Yegnong (men's super heavyweight), secured their spots by advancing to the final match of their respective weight divisions at the 2020 African Qualification Tournament in Diamniadio, Senegal.

Judo

Cameroon qualified two female judoka for each of the following weight classes at the Games. Rio 2016 Olympian Hortence Atangana was selected among the top 18 judoka of the women's heavyweight (+78 kg) category based on the IJF World Ranking List of June 28, 2021, while 2019 African Games bronze medalist Ayuk Otay Arrey Sophina (women's middleweight, 70 kg) accepted a continental berth from Africa as the nation's top-ranked judoka outside of direct qualifying position.

Swimming

Cameroon received a universality invitation from FINA to send two top-ranked swimmers (one per gender) in their respective individual events to the Olympics, based on the FINA Points System of June 28, 2021.

Table tennis
 
Cameroon entered one athlete into the table tennis competition at the Games for the first time in eight years. London 2012 Olympian Sarah Hanffou scored a semifinal victory to occupy one of the four available spots in the women's singles at the 2020 African Olympic Qualification Tournament in Tunis, Tunisia.

Weightlifting

Cameroon entered two female weightlifters into the Olympic competition. Jeanne Gaëlle Eyenga (women's 76 kg) and Clementine Meukeugni (women's 87 kg) topped the list of weightlifters from Africa in their respective weight categories based on the IWF Absolute Continental Rankings.

Wrestling

Cameroon qualified one wrestler for the women's freestyle 53 kg into the Olympic competition, by progressing to the top two finals at the 2021 African & Oceania Qualification Tournament in Hammamet, Tunisia.

Freestyle

References

External links
 Cameroon at the 2020 Summer Olympics at Olympedia

Nations at the 2020 Summer Olympics
2020
2021 in Cameroonian sport